In the Nick of Time is a 1991 American made-for-television Christmas fantasy-comedy film directed by George T. Miller. The film was first telecast December 16, 1991 on NBC.

Plot
The old Santa Claus (Bridges) has seven days to find the new Santa Claus (Tucker) and pass the torch to him. The only problem is the new Santa Claus is a curmudgeon who lost his wife and his will to live. He works as a reporter for The Chicago Sun Times, which is a throwback to Yes, Virginia, there is a Santa Claus, and has to rediscover the joy of Christmas. At the last minute, he realizes what is important and becomes the new Santa Claus.

Cast
Lloyd Bridges - Santa Claus
Michael Tucker - Ben Talbot
Cleavon Little - Freddy (last appearance)
Conrad Bergschneider - Louie
Matt Birman - Window Dresser
Richard Blackburn - William
Steve Cliffe - Gang Member #1
Jessica DiCicco - Aimee Misch
Lucy Filippone - Sheila
Elvira Graham - Tough Chick
Ted Hanlan - Ward Santa
Thomas Hauff - Figgus
Ken James - Ridley
Phillip Jarrett - Cop
Jamie Jones - Nick
Michael Lamport - Godfrey
Alison LaPlaca - Susan Rosewell
Corey Macri - Gang Member #2
A Martinez - Charlie Misch
Martin Martinuzzi - Bartender
Jenny Parsons - Melina Liviakis
Adrian Paul - Interviewer
Bryan Renfro - Folksinger
Jackie Richardson - Nurse
Wayne Robson - Melvin
Roland Smith - Messenger
Audrey Webb - Sheila
Thick Wilson - Street Santa

See also
 List of Christmas films
 Santa Claus in film

External links

1991 television films
1991 films
1990s fantasy comedy films
American fantasy comedy films
American Christmas comedy films
Santa Claus in film
Films set in New York City
Films directed by George T. Miller
Films scored by Steve Dorff
Christmas television films
1990s Christmas films
1990s Christmas comedy films
1990s English-language films
1990s American films